Yves Thériault, OC (November 27, 1915 – October 20, 1983) was a Canadian author.

He was born in Quebec City to Alcide and Aurore (Nadeau) Thériault. On April 21, 1942, he married Germaine Blanchet, with whom he had two children, Marie-José and Yves-Michel. As a child he dropped out of school at the age of 15, holding many miscellaneous jobs until he became a known writer.

Perhaps his best-known work is Agaguk, a story of cultural conflict between Inuit and white men, published in 1958.

In 1975, he was made an Officer of the Order of Canada in recognition for being "one of the most prolific writers and best-known novelists in Canada".

He was a member of the Canadian Authors Association, the International PEN Club, and

Selected works
Contes pour un homme seul - 1944
La Fille Laide- 1950
Le Dompteur d'ours - 1950
Les Vendeurs du Temple - 1953
Aaron - 1954, reprinted for Paris distribution in 1956.
Agaguk - 1958, printed for Paris distribution as well, translated into German, Italian, Portuguese, Japanese and Spanish in 1959. 
Ashini - 1961, received the Governor General's Award for French Language Fiction.
Cul-de-sac, Institut littéraire du Québec, Québec, 1961; Les Quinze (collection 10/10), Montréal, 1981

Notes

External links
Yves Thériault's entry in The Canadian Encyclopedia
Yves Thériault, interviewed by Victor Teboul, Ph.D.

1915 births
1983 deaths
Canadian male novelists
Officers of the Order of Canada
Writers from Quebec City
Governor General's Award-winning fiction writers
Prix Athanase-David winners
20th-century Canadian novelists
Canadian novelists in French
20th-century Canadian male writers
Burials at Notre Dame des Neiges Cemetery